The One is Uverworld's seventh original album, which contains 13 tracks. It was released on November 28, 2012. The members came up with the title because they feel that "our fans and people become "one", and as a team, each and every person's unique personalities become interwoven." They also stated that "after being active for 12 years, we've finally arrived at stage 1." The album will contain "Reversi", which will serve as the theme song for the upcoming Ao no Exorcist movie (December 28 release) as well as "The Over", which was used as the theme song for the drama series Kuro no Onna Kyoshi.

The DVD for the limited edition will come with footage from Live at Avaco Studio and music videos. It will also enclose a 24-page special booklet.

The album reached #4 rank weekly and charted for 16 weeks.

Track listing 
All tracks arranged by UVERworld and Satoru Hiraide.

References

2012 albums
Uverworld albums
Gr8! Records albums
Japanese-language albums